Personal foul may refer to:

Sports

Rules 
 Personal foul (American football), a type of penalty in American football
 Personal foul (basketball)
 Personal foul (field lacrosse)
 Personal foul (water polo)

Other 

"Personal Foul" (CSI: NY), an episode of the American television series Crime Scene Investigation
Personal Foul (book), a tell all book written by convicted NBA referee Tim Donaghy